The 2021–22 Newport County A.F.C. season was the club's ninth consecutive season in the EFL League Two. It was Newport's 69th season in the Football League and 101st season of league football overall. Alongside League Two, they also competed in the FA Cup, the EFL Cup, the EFL Trophy and the Welsh League Cup. The season covered the period from 1 June 2021 to 31 May 2022. On 25 August 2021 Newport County faced Southampton of the Premier League in the second round of the 2021-22 EFL Cup but they lost heavily 8-0. Newport finished the 2021-22 League Two season in 11th place.

Managerial changes
On 1 October 2021, manager Michael Flynn resigned after nine league matches of the 2021-22 season with Newport 15th in League Two. Newport County's Assistant Manager Wayne Hatswell was appointed as caretaker manager for five games. On 19 October 2021 it was confirmed that the club had appointed Cardiff City First Team Coach James Rowberry as permanent manager with Newport 13th in League Two after 13 league games. Hatswell was retained as assistant manager to Rowberry and Hatswell signed a contract extension in November 2021 until the end of the 2023-24 season. In February 2022 Hatswell resigned his position at Newport and on 22 February 2022 Hatswell was appointed assistant head coach to Michael Flynn at Walsall.  On the same day, Cardiff City coach Carl Serrant was appointed assistant manager to Rowberry at Newport County.

Pre-season friendlies
The Exiles confirmed they would have friendly matches against Undy, Blackpool, Chippenham Town, Cinderford Town and Cardiff City as part of their pre-season preparations.

Competitions

League Two

League table

Results summary

Results by matchday

Matches
Newport County's fixtures were released on 24 June 2021. On 7 July, the fixture dates against Mansfield Town were reversed due to pitch renovation work at Newport's Rodney Parade ground during August 2021.

FA Cup

EFL Cup

EFL Trophy

Newport County were drawn into Southern Group F. The dates for the group stage fixtures were confirmed on 3 August 2021.

Welsh League Cup

The draw for the Welsh League Cup sponsored by Nathaniel MG was made on 24 June 2021 with Newport County and Denbigh Town invited as wildcard entries.

Transfers

Transfers in

Loans in

Loans out

Transfers out

References

Newport County
Newport County A.F.C. seasons
Welsh football clubs 2021–22 season